Bevanoor is a village in Belgaum district in the southern state of Karnataka, India. It is known for sugarcane, turmeric, wheat and maize agriculture.

References

Villages in Belagavi district